Bob Page may refer to:

 Bob Page (blues musician) (born 1953), Atlanta-based blues and boogie-woogie piano player
 Bob Page (Deus Ex character), a fictional character in the game Deus Ex
 Bob Page (sportscaster), American sportscaster
 Bob Page (rower) (born 1936), New Zealand rower also known as Bob Page

See also
Robert Page (disambiguation)